The Birnhorn (2,634 m) is an isolated mountain in the Leoganger Steinberge, Northern Limestone Alps, Austria.

See also
List of Alpine peaks by prominence

References

External links
"Birnhorn, Austria" on Peakbagger

Mountains of the Alps
Mountains of Salzburg (state)